Leandro Altair Machado known as Leandro Machado (born July 15, 1963 in Sapiranga) is a Brazilian football manager.

Tokyo Verdy
In 2003, Leandro signed with J1 League club Tokyo Verdy and served as a coach under manager Lori Sandri. In May, Lori Sandri was sacked after the match Verdy lost 2–7 to Júbilo Iwata on May 5. So, Leandro managed the club as caretaker from next match on May 10. He managed 3 matches until Verdy signed with new manager Osvaldo Ardiles in June. He left Verdy in August.

Managerial statistics

Honours

References

External links

1963 births
Living people
Brazilian football managers
Campeonato Brasileiro Série A managers
Campeonato Brasileiro Série B managers
J1 League managers
Tokyo Verdy managers
Clube 15 de Novembro managers
América Futebol Clube (MG) managers
Sociedade Esportiva e Recreativa Caxias do Sul managers
Criciúma Esporte Clube managers
Clube Náutico Capibaribe managers
Associação Chapecoense de Futebol managers
Clube Esportivo Bento Gonçalves managers
Joinville Esporte Clube managers
Veranópolis Esporte Clube Recreativo e Cultural managers
Sociedade Esportiva Recreativa e Cultural Brasil managers
Esporte Clube São Luiz managers
Campinense Clube managers
Clube Esportivo Aimoré managers